The 1st Army Aviation Brigade "Kilkis-Lachanas" (abbreviated 1η ΤΑΞΑΣ) is the main formation of the Hellenic Army's Army Aviation.

History
In August, 1950, the first Αrmy Aviation unit was created, belonging to Artillery, the 190th Air Observation Unit, based at Megara airport. Also, few years later, a special Air Observation School was created in order to provide training, in parallel with the establishment of other support units. At that time, the unit's main activities included target detection for Artillery units and light transportation.

One of the most important dates was 1961, when the first helicopters, the Bell 47G, were delivered, marking the eve of new era, that of air assault and medium transportation. The modernization continued with the acquisition of Bell UH-1 Iroquoises in 1969, Boeing CH-47 Chinooks in 1981 and recently with the delivery of the Boeing AH-64D Apache and NHIndustries NH90.

With the continuous growth of the Hellenic Army Aviation combat arm, the 1st Army Aviation Brigade was founded in 1998 to encompass  its various units. Since 2013, the brigade is subordinated to the First Army via the 1st Infantry Division. The brigade's headquarters is at Stefanovikeio.

The brigade bears the honorific title "Kilkis Lachanas", in commemoration of the Battle of Kilkis–Lachanas during the Second Balkan War.

The brigade's motto  ("The zeal for freedom does not die") is an epigram written by Antiphilus of Byzantium about the warrior king Leonidas of Sparta.

Structure 

at brigade headquarters at Stefanovikeio, Thessaly:
 Headquarters Company
 17th Signal Company (17 ΛΔΒ)
 1st Attack Helicopter Battalion (1o ΤΕΕΠ)
 2nd Attack Helicopter Battalion (2o ΤΕΕΠ)
 1st Army Aviation Battalion (1o ΤΕΑΣ)
 1st Airfield Support Battalion (1ο ΤΥΑΔ)
 307th Technical Support Group (307 TYΠ)
 2nd Army Aviation Regiment (2ο ΣΥΑΣ), based at Megara, Attica
 Signal Company
 2nd Army Aviation Battalion (2ο ΤΕΑΣ) 
 4th Army Aviation Battalion (4ο ΤΕΑΣ)
 2nd Airfield Support Battalion (2ο ΤΥΑΔ)
 at Alexandreia, Macedonia
 3rd Army Aviation Battalion (3ο ΤΕΑΣ)

References

1998 establishments in Greece
Military units and formations established in 1998
Brigades of Greece
Greek army aviation
Army aviation brigades